Marcus de Bye sometimes spelt de Bie or de Bije (1638/39, The Hague - after 1688) was a Dutch painter and engraver.

Life
He learnt to paint under Jacob van der Does, and produced some landscapes with animals  in the style his teacher, but he is best known for his etchings of animals, after the designs of Paulus Potter and Markus Gerard. Member of Confrerie Pictura. He died in 1670.

Works

His works include

The fat Spitzhund.
The Mule-driver.
Three sets, of eight each, of Cows and Oxen, after Potter.
A set of sixteen of Sheep, after Potter.
A set of sixteen of Goats, after Potter.
A set of sixteen of Lions, Leopards, Wolves, Bears, etc., after Potter.
A set of sixteen of the Natural History of the Bear; after Markus Gerard. 1664.

References

Sources

External links

 https://rkd.nl/en/explore/artists/14596

1630s births
1690s deaths
Dutch engravers
Dutch Golden Age painters
Dutch male painters
Artists from The Hague